West Brunswick Township is a township in Schuylkill County, Pennsylvania, United States. Brunswick Township was formed in 1801 as one of the original townships of Schuylkill County, being named for Brunswick (Braunschweig), Germany.  In 1835, Brunswick Township was divided into East and West Brunswick Townships.  Among the village names in the township are Molino, Pinedale and Frisbie.

Geography
According to the United States Census Bureau, the township has a total area of 30.5 square miles (79.1 km2), of which 30.3 square miles (78.6 km2) is land and 0.2 square mile (0.5 km2; 0.66%) is water.

Demographics

As of the census of 2000, there were 3,428 people, 1,323 households, and 998 families living in the township.  The population density was 113.0 people per square mile (43.6/km2).  There were 1,402 housing units at an average density of 46.2/sq mi (17.8/km2).  The racial makeup of the township was 96.65% White, 0.23% African American, 0.06% Native American, 2.22% Asian, 0.12% from other races, and 0.73% from two or more races. Hispanic or Latino people of any race were 0.26% of the population.

There were 1,323 households, out of which 31.2% had children under the age of 18 living with them, 67.2% were married couples living together, 5.4% had a female householder with no husband present, and 24.5% were non-families. 21.4% of all households were made up of individuals, and 7.7% had someone living alone who was 65 years of age or older.  The average household size was 2.54 and the average family size was 2.96.

In the township the population was spread out, with 22.3% under the age of 18, 6.4% from 18 to 24, 26.9% from 25 to 44, 28.7% from 45 to 64, and 15.7% who were 65 years of age or older.  The median age was 42 years. For every 100 females, there were 99.5 males.  For every 100 females age 18 and over, there were 95.5 males.

The median income for a household in the township was $47,091, and the median income for a family was $51,292. Males had a median income of $39,886 versus $22,398 for females. The per capita income for the township was $27,436.  About 4.7% of families and 5.4% of the population were below the poverty line, including 2.8% of those under age 18 and 9.9% of those age 65 or over.

Recreation
Portions of the Pennsylvania State Game Lands Number 106 and Number 110, which carry the Appalachian National Scenic Trail, are located along the southern border of the township.

References

Townships in Schuylkill County, Pennsylvania
Townships in Pennsylvania